Hacıahmetler can refer to the following villages in Turkey:

 Hacıahmetler, Düzce
 Hacıahmetler, İvrindi
 Hacıahmetler, Mengen